Shiva is a 2008 Israeli drama film, also known by its English title as 7 Days, Seven Days and The Seven Days by Ronit Elkabetz and Shlomi Elkabetz. It is the second feature to be directed by the siblings following the unhappy marriage of Viviane Amsalem following 2004's To Take a Wife. In 2014 it was succeeded by the final film in the trilogy Gett: The Trial of Viviane Amsalem.

Plot
For seven days a large family of Moroccan descent observes the Jewish mourning ritual of shiva when a brother dies. Living together again reveals many tensions and conflicts between family members. Amid the tensions, the Gulf War rages in the background.

Cast
 Ronit Elkabetz as Vivianne
 Albert Lluz as Meir
 Yaël Abecassis as Lili
 Simon Abkarian as Eliau
 Hana Laszlo as Ita
 Moshe Ivgy as Haim
 Keren Mor as Ilana
 Alon Aboutboul as Itamar

Reception
The film received mixed reviews. Variety compared it unfavourably to To Take a Wife while at the same time praising the acting as "flawless". The Jerusalem Post wondered "why they ha[d] been asked to spend two hours listening to the angry resentments of a disintegrating family, even if they admire the cast and co-directors' skill..."

References

External links
 

2008 films
Films directed by Ronit Elkabetz
Films about Jews and Judaism
French war drama films
2000s French-language films
2000s Arabic-language films
2000s Hebrew-language films
2000s war drama films
Gulf War films
Films about Moroccan Jews
Israeli war drama films
2008 drama films
2008 multilingual films
Israeli multilingual films
2000s French films